The Media Union was a trade union representing German workers in the printing, paper, journalism and arts.

The union was founded on 15 April 1989 at a meeting in Hamburg, with the merger of the Printing and Paper Union and the Arts Union.  Initially, it had nine sectoral groups: Printing and Publishing, Paper and Plastics Processing, Broadcasting/Film/Audio-visual Media (RFFU), Journalism (dju/SWYV), Association of German Writers (VS), Fine Arts (BGBK), Performing Arts (IAL/Theater), Music (DMV/GDMK), Publishers and Agencies.  In October 1990, it absorbed the East German Printing and Paper Union and Arts Union, and for a time renamed itself as IG Medien Deutschlands.

By 1998, the union had 184,656 members.  In 2001, it merged with the German Postal Union, the German Salaried Employees' Union, the Public Services, Transport and Traffic Union, and the Trade, Banking and Insurance Union, to form Ver.di.

Presidents
1989: Erwin Ferlemann
1992: Detlev Hensche

References

Communications trade unions
Trade unions established in 1989
Trade unions disestablished in 2001
Trade unions in Germany